John Aidan Liddell,  (3 August 1888 – 31 August 1915) was a British military pilot and a recipient of the Victoria Cross, the highest award for gallantry in the face of the enemy that can be awarded to British and Commonwealth forces.

Early life 
Liddell was born in Newcastle upon Tyne on 3 August 1888. He was educated at Stonyhurst College, Lancashire and Balliol College, Oxford, where he took the Honours Course in Zoology.

Military career 
Liddell, not wishing himself "to be a slacker", joined the Officers' Special Reserve of the 3rd Battalion, Argyll and Sutherland Highlanders (Princess Louise's) of the British Army in 1912. He obtained his pilot's certificate in May 1914 and, following the outbreak of the First World War, the now-Captain Liddell embarked with his battalion on 28 August for service in France. He spent 43 consecutive days in the trenches in command of the machine gun section and was awarded the Military Cross at Le Maisnil, France, before training as a pilot and joining No. 7 Squadron of the Royal Flying Corps.

On 31 July 1915, while flying reconnaissance over Ostend-Bruges-Ghent, Belgium, Liddell's aircraft was raked by machine gun fire and Liddell was severely wounded in his right thigh. This caused momentary unconsciousness, but by great effort he recovered partial control of his machine when it had dropped nearly 3,000 feet and succeeded, although fired on, in completing the course and brought the plane back into the Allied lines. The control wheel and throttle control were smashed, as was part of the undercarriage and cockpit, but the machine and life of the observer were saved. In recognition of his feat, Liddell was awarded the Victoria Cross.

Death and legacy 

After having his leg removed and septic poisoning setting in, Liddell died of his wounds a month later at De Panne, Flanders, Belgium, on 31 August 1915, aged 27. He is buried in the Holy Ghost Cemetery in Basingstoke with his sister Dorothy Liddell who went out to serve in the hospital where he died for the remainder of the war.

A brass "In Memoriam" tablet was erected to Aidan Liddell in the Scottish Naval and Military Residence, Edinburgh. The inscription on the brass tablet runs as follows:

A memorial to him was also erected at Balliol College, on the west wall of the Chapel passage. His VC is on display in the Lord Ashcroft Gallery at the Imperial War Museum, London.

A plaque also exists in the Church of the Holy Rude in Stirling, close to Stirling Castle, home of his regiment.

On 29 August 2017 a memorial was unveiled outside the Discovery Museum in Newcastle upon Tyne, where Liddell and Privates Edward Lawson and Adam Wakenshaw are commemorated.

References

External links 

1888 births
1915 deaths
People educated at Stonyhurst College
Alumni of Balliol College, Oxford
Royal Flying Corps officers
Military personnel from Newcastle upon Tyne
Argyll and Sutherland Highlanders officers
British World War I recipients of the Victoria Cross
Royal Flying Corps recipients of the Victoria Cross
British Army personnel of World War I
British military personnel killed in World War I
Recipients of the Military Cross
British Army recipients of the Victoria Cross